The Canton of Caudebec-lès-Elbeuf is a canton situated in the Seine-Maritime département in the Normandy region of northern France.

Geography 
The area is noted for motorcar manufacturing, farming, forestry and light industry in the arrondissement of Rouen, centred on the town of Caudebec-lès-Elbeuf.

Composition 
At the French canton reorganisation which came into effect in March 2015, the canton was expanded from 6 to 7 communes:
Caudebec-lès-Elbeuf
Cléon
Freneuse
Saint-Aubin-lès-Elbeuf
Saint-Pierre-lès-Elbeuf
Sotteville-sous-le-Val
Tourville-la-Rivière

Population

See also 
 Arrondissements of the Seine-Maritime department
 Cantons of the Seine-Maritime department
 Communes of the Seine-Maritime department

References

Caudebec-les-Elbeuf